Newbury Abbot Trent (14 October 1885 – 2 August 1953) was an English sculptor and medallist. Trent studied at the Royal College of Art and Royal Academy Schools, where he became an associate. His works include reliefs, statues and other forms of sculpture. Many of his most notable works are war memorials in England, Scotland and Wales.

Background
Abbot Trent was born in Forest Gate in Essex on 14 October 1885.  He was the son of Walter F. Trent who was a builder and ship fitter by trade.  His cousin was the cinema architect William Edward Trent. At an early age he was adopted by Thomas Armstrong the painter.  He studied at the Royal College of Art and the Royal Academy Schools. He married (Phyllis) Hilda Ledward who was the daughter of the sculptor Richard Arthur Ledward (1857–90) and sister to Gilbert Ledward (1888–1960). They had two daughters: Margaret (Peggy) and Jennifer 1917–2002, who both trained as architects. Trent became an Associate of the Royal Academy and worked throughout his life from a studio on Beaufort Street, London. He died on 2 August 1953. His cremation took place at Putney Vale Crematorium.

Works

List of works
The following is a partial list of Trent's work, other than war memorials.

War memorials

References

1885 births
1953 deaths
English male sculptors
Sculptors from London
Alumni of the Royal College of Art
20th-century British sculptors